Daniel William Lawler (March 28, 1859 – September 15, 1926) was a mayor of Saint Paul, Minnesota.

Lawler was born in Prairie du Chien, Wisconsin and moved to Minnesota in the 1880s. He became a lawyer. He was a Roman Catholic. Lawler was an unsuccessful candidate for Governor of Minnesota 1892, losing to Knute Nelson. He was mayor of Saint Paul from 1908 to 1910. In 1912, he ran for the United States Senate from Minnesota, losing once again to Nelson. He also unsuccessfully ran for the Senate in 1916, losing to future United States Secretary of State Frank B. Kellogg. Lawler was also a delegate to the Democratic National Convention that year.

Lawler died in Saint Paul and is buried in Calvary Cemetery there.

References

External links
The Political Graveyard

1859 births
1926 deaths
Catholics from Wisconsin
Catholics from Minnesota
Mayors of Saint Paul, Minnesota
Minnesota lawyers
People from Prairie du Chien, Wisconsin
19th-century American lawyers